Tom Amandes (born March 9, 1959) is an American actor. His best-known role to date is that of Eliot Ness in the 1990s television series The Untouchables; he also played Geena Davis' boyfriend in The Long Kiss Goodnight, and Abraham Lincoln in the 2013 film Saving Lincoln.

Career 
Amandes was born the sixth of 11 children in Richmond, Illinois. Amandes began acting at an early age, performing at home with his siblings and starring in school productions. He graduated in 1977 from Crystal Lake Central High School. In 1981, after graduating from the Goodman School of Drama at DePaul University, Amandes set out to apprentice on the Chicago stage.

A turning point in Amandes' career was being cast as Eliot Ness in the television series The Untouchables. He went on to star in The Pursuit of Happiness with Brad Garrett and Larry Miller. Amandes co-starred in the TV drama Everwood from 2002 to 2006. Other television credits include recurring roles on The Guardian, JAG, Spin City, Sisters and From the Earth to the Moon, in which Amandes portrayed Astronaut Harrison 'Jack' Schmitt. Amandes has guest-starred on Roseanne, The Practice, The King of Queens, Just Shoot Me!, ER, Seven Days, The Larry Sanders Show, Greek, Chicago Fire, The Good Guys, NUMB3RS, and Private Practice.

During his summer hiatus, Amandes wrapped production on the comedy Dirty Deeds. He has appeared in the films Brokedown Palace, Second Chances, Straight Talk, and Billboard Dad. Amandes appeared in the HBO film Live From Baghdad.

Amandes appeared in the fourth season of Arrow as cyber-criminal Noah Kuttler/the Calculator.

Filmography

Film

Television

References

External links

Tom Amandes cast bio on The WB

1959 births
Male actors from Illinois
American male film actors
American male television actors
American television directors
DePaul University alumni
Living people
People from Richmond, Illinois